The 1966 Australian Drivers' Championship was a CAMS sanctioned Australian motor racing title for drivers of racing cars complying with either the Australian National Formula or the Australian 1½ Litre Formula. The winner of the title, which was the tenth Australian Drivers' Championship, was awarded the 1966 CAMS Gold Star.

The championship was won by Spencer Martin driving a Repco-Brabham BT11A Coventry Climax for Bob Jane Racing.

Calendar

The championship was contested over a six-round series with one race per round.

Each round also incorporated a round of the 1966 Australian One and a Half Litre Championship.

Points system
Championship points were awarded on a 9-6-4-3-2-1 basis to the first six finishers in each round. Only the best five round results could be obtained by each driver.

The championship was open to holders of a General Competition License issued by CAMS.

Results

Note:
 Kerry Grant placed sixth at Lakeside  however the New Zealand driver  was not awarded championship points.
 Roly Levis placed sixth at Surfers Paradise  however the New Zealand driver  was not awarded championship points.
 Frank Gardner (Repco-Brabham) won the Hordern Trophy but was not awarded championship points as he was not classified as an "Australian Resident".

Notes and references

Further reading
 Jim Shepherd, A History of Australian Motor Sport, 1980
 Australian Motor Racing Annual, 1967
 Martin the Master at Lakeside, Racing Car News, August 1966, pages 20–21
 Martin Scores Magnificent Gold Star, Racing Car News, September 1966, pages 34–36
 Harvey Wins by Large Margin, The Advertiser, 11 October 1966
 Harvey Heads for 1½ Litre Title, Racing Car News, November 1966, page 34
 Solid Sandown, Racing Car News, December 1966, page 18
 Cusack's Luck Changes, Racing Car News, December 1966, pages 34–35
 Spencer Martin – Australia's Champion, Racing Car News, January 1967, pages 28–29

External links
Australian Gold Star 1966, www.oldracingcars.com
1966 Gold Star images, members.optusnet.com.au/dandsshaw, as archived at web.archive.org

Australian Drivers' Championship
Drivers' Championship